The Celeron is a family of microprocessors from Intel targeted at the low-end consumer market. CPUs in the Celeron brand have used designs from sixth- to eighth-generation CPU microarchitectures.

Desktop processors

P6 based Celerons

Celeron (single-core)

"Covington" (250 nm) 
 All models support: MMX
 Steppings: A0, A1, B0

"Mendocino" (250 nm) 
 All models support: MMX
 L2 cache is on-die, running at full CPU speed

"Coppermine-128" (180 nm) 
 All models support: MMX, SSE

"Tualatin-256" (130 nm) 
 Family 6 model 11
 All models support: MMX, SSE

Netburst based Celerons

Celeron (single-core)

"Willamette-128" (180 nm) 
 Family 15 model 1
 All models support: MMX, SSE, SSE2
 Steppings: E0

"Northwood-128" (130 nm) 
 Family 15 model 2
 All models support: MMX, SSE, SSE2
 Steppings: C0, C1, D0, D1, D4, DD

Celeron D (single core)

"Prescott-256" (90 nm) 
 All models support: MMX, SSE, SSE2, SSE3
 Intel 64: supported by 3x1, 3x6, 355
 XD bit (an NX bit implementation): supported by 3x0J, 3x5J, and all Intel64-compatible models
 Steppings: C0, D0, E0, G0 & G1

"Cedar Mill-512" (65 nm) 
 All models support: MMX, SSE, SSE2, SSE3, Intel 64, XD bit (an NX bit implementation)
 Steppings: C1, D0

Core based Celerons

Celeron (single-core)

"Conroe-L" (65 nm)
 All models support: MMX, SSE, SSE2, SSE3, SSSE3, Intel 64, XD bit (an NX bit implementation)
 Steppings: A1

"Conroe-CL" (65 nm)
 All models support: MMX, SSE, SSE2, SSE3, SSSE3, Intel 64, XD bit (an NX bit implementation), Intel VT-x
 Steppings: ?

Celeron (dual-core)

"Allendale" (65 nm) 
All models support: MMX, SSE, SSE2, SSE3, SSSE3, Enhanced Intel SpeedStep Technology (EIST), Intel 64, XD bit (an NX bit implementation)
 Steppings: M0

"Wolfdale-3M" (45 nm) 
 Based on Core microarchitecture
 All models support: MMX, SSE, SSE2, SSE3, SSSE3, Enhanced Intel SpeedStep Technology (EIST), Intel 64, XD bit (an NX bit implementation), Intel VT-x
 Steppings: R0
 Die size: 82 mm2

Westmere based Celerons

Celeron (dual-core)

"Clarkdale" (MCP, 32 nm) 
 Based on Westmere microarchitecture
 All models support: MMX, SSE, SSE2, SSE3, SSSE3, Enhanced Intel SpeedStep Technology (EIST), Intel 64, XD bit (an NX bit implementation), Intel VT-x, Smart Cache.
 Contains 45 nm "Ironlake" GPU.

Sandy Bridge based Celerons

"Sandy Bridge" (32 nm) 
 All models support: MMX, SSE, SSE2, SSE3, SSSE3, SSE4.1, SSE4.2, Enhanced Intel SpeedStep Technology (EIST), Intel 64, XD bit (an NX bit implementation), Intel VT-x, Smart Cache.
 Celeron G440 does not support Enhanced Intel SpeedStep Technology (EIST), this is a special case as the processor uses the minimum available multiplier (16x). The Celeron G440 also does not support Hyper-threading.
 Celeron G460, G465 and G470 support Hyper-threading.
 HD Graphics (Sandy Bridge) contain 6 EUs like the HD Graphics 2000, but does not support the following technologies: Intel Quick Sync Video, InTru 3D, Clear Video HD, Wireless Display, and it does not support 3D Video.
 Transistors: 624 or 504 million
 Die size: 149 or 131 mm2

"Ivy Bridge" (22 nm) 
 All models support: MMX, SSE, SSE2, SSE3, SSSE3, SSE4.1, SSE4.2, Enhanced Intel SpeedStep Technology (EIST), Intel 64, XD bit (an NX bit implementation), Intel VT-x, Smart Cache, ECC Memory.
 HD Graphics (Ivy Bridge) contain 6 EUs as well as HD Graphics 2500, but does not support the following technologies: Intel Quick Sync Video, InTru 3D, Clear Video HD, Wireless Display, Intel Insider.

Silvermont based Celerons

"Bay Trail-D" (22 nm)
 All models support: MMX, SSE, SSE2, SSE3, SSSE3, Enhanced Intel SpeedStep Technology (EIST), Intel 64, Intel VT-x.
 GPU and memory controller are integrated onto the processor die
 GPU is based on Ivy Bridge Intel HD Graphics, with 4 execution units, and supports DirectX 11, OpenGL 4.0, OpenGL ES 3.0 and OpenCL 1.1 (on Windows). J1800 and J1900 support Intel Quick Sync Video.
 Package size:  25 mm × 27 mm

Airmont based Celerons

"Braswell" (14 nm)
 All models support: MMX, SSE, SSE2, SSE3, SSSE3, SSE4.1, SSE4.2, Enhanced Intel SpeedStep Technology (EIST), Intel 64, XD bit (an NX bit implementation), Intel VT-x, AES-NI.
 GPU and memory controller are integrated onto the processor die
 GPU is based on Broadwell Intel HD Graphics, with 12 execution units, and supports DirectX 11.2, OpenGL 4.4, OpenGL ES 3.0 and OpenCL 2.0 (on Windows).
 Package size: 25 mm × 27 mm

Haswell based Celerons

"Haswell-DT" (22 nm) 
 All models support: MMX, SSE, SSE2, SSE3, SSSE3, SSE4.1, SSE4.2, Enhanced Intel SpeedStep Technology (EIST), Intel 64, XD bit (an NX bit implementation), Intel VT-x, Smart Cache.
 Haswell Celerons support Quick Sync.
 Haswell-R Celerons G1840, G1850, and G1840T also support Intel Wireless Display.
 Transistors: 1.4 billion
 Die size: 177 mm2
 All models support ECC memory.

Skylake based Celerons

"Skylake-S" (14 nm) 
 All models support: MMX, SSE, SSE2, SSE3, SSSE3, SSE4.1, SSE4.2, Enhanced Intel SpeedStep Technology (EIST), Intel 64, XD bit (an NX bit implementation), Intel VT-x, Intel VT-d, AES-NI, Smart Cache.
 All models support up to DDR3-1600 or DDR4-2133 memory.
 All models support ECC memory.
 Transistors: TBD
 Die size: TBD

Goldmont based Celerons

"Apollo Lake" (14 nm)
 All models support: MMX, SSE, SSE2, SSE3, SSSE3, SSE4.1, SSE4.2, Enhanced Intel SpeedStep Technology (EIST), Intel 64, XD bit (an NX bit implementation), Intel VT-x, Intel VT-d, AES-NI, TXT/TXE
 Package size: 24 mm × 31 mm
 DDR3L/LPDDR3/LPDDR4 dual-channel memory controller supporting up to 8 GB
 Display controller with 1 MIPI DSI port and 2 DDI ports (eDP 1.3, DP 1.1a, or HDMI 1.4b)
 Integrated Intel HD Graphics (Gen9) GPU
 PCI Express 2.0 controller supporting 6 lanes (3 dedicated and 3 multiplexed with USB 3.0); 4 lanes available externally
 Two USB 3.0 ports (1 dual role, 1 dedicated, 3 multiplexed with PCI Express 2.0 and 1 multiplexed with one SATA-300 port)
 Two USB 2.0 ports
 Two SATA-600 ports (one multiplexed with USB 3.0)
 Integrated HD audio controller
 Integrated image signal processor supporting four MIPI CSI ports and 13 MP sensors
 Integrated memory card reader supporting SDIO 3.01 and eMMC 5.0
 Serial I/O supporting SPI, HSUART (serial port) and I2C

Goldmont Plus based Celerons

"Gemini Lake" (14 nm)
 All models support: MMX, SSE, SSE2, SSE3, SSSE3, SSE4.1, SSE4.2, Enhanced Intel SpeedStep Technology (EIST), Intel 64, XD bit (an NX bit implementation), Intel SGX, Intel VT-x, Intel VT-d, AES-NI.
 GPU and memory controller are integrated onto the processor die
 GPU is based on Kaby Lake Intel HD Graphics, with 12 execution units, and supports DirectX 12, OpenGL 4.5, OpenGL ES 3.0 and OpenCL 2.0 (on Windows).
 Package size: 25 mm × 24 mm

"Gemini Lake Refresh" (14 nm)
 All models support: MMX, SSE, SSE2, SSE3, SSSE3, SSE4.1, SSE4.2, Enhanced Intel SpeedStep Technology (EIST), Intel 64, XD bit (an NX bit implementation), Intel SGX, Intel VT-x, Intel VT-d, AES-NI.
 GPU and memory controller are integrated onto the processor die
 GPU is based on Kaby Lake Intel HD Graphics, with 12 execution units, and supports DirectX 12, OpenGL 4.5, OpenGL ES 3.0 and OpenCL 2.0 (on Windows).
 Package size: 25 mm × 24 mm

Kaby Lake based Celerons

"Kaby Lake-S" (14 nm) 
 All models support: MMX, SSE, SSE2, SSE3, SSSE3, SSE4.1, SSE4.2, Enhanced Intel SpeedStep Technology (EIST), Intel 64, XD bit (an NX bit implementation), Intel VT-x, Intel VT-d, AES-NI, Smart Cache.
 All models support up to DDR3-1600 or DDR4-2400 memory (DDR4-2133 for embedded models).
 All models support ECC memory.
 Transistors: TBD
 Die size: TBD

Coffee Lake based Celerons

"Coffee Lake-S" (14 nm)

"Coffee Lake-H" (14 nm)

Comet Lake based Celerons

"Comet Lake-S" (14 nm)

Tremont based Celerons

"Jasper Lake" (10 nm)
 All models support: MMX, SSE, SSE2, SSE3, SSSE3, SSE4.1, SSE4.2, Enhanced Intel SpeedStep Technology (EIST), Intel 64, XD bit (an NX bit implementation), Intel VT-x, Intel VT-d, AES-NI, Intel SHA Extensions, Intel SGX, SMAP/SMEP
 Package size: 35 mm x 24 mm
 DDR4/LPDDR4 dual-channel memory controller supporting up to 16 GB
 Display controller with 1 MIPI DSI 1.2 port and 3 DDI ports (eDP 1.4b, MIPI DSI 1.2, DP 1.4a, or HDMI 2.0b)
 Integrated Intel HD Graphics (Gen11) GPU
 PCI Express 3.0 controller supporting 8 lanes (multiplexed); 4 lanes available externally
 Two USB 3.2 2x1 ports (a.k.a. USB 3.1)
 Four USB 3.2 1x1 ports (a.k.a. USB 3.0)
 Eight USB 2.0 ports
 Two SATA-600 ports
 Integrated HD audio controller
 Integrated image signal processor supporting four cameras (three concurrent)
 Integrated memory card reader supporting SDIO 3.0 and eMMC 5.1
 Serial I/O supporting SPI, HSUART (serial port) and I2C
 Integrated CNVi with Wi-Fi 6 (IEEE 802.11ax 1x1 and 2x2) and Bluetooth 5.x (using UART/I2S/USB2)

Golden Cove based Celerons

"Alder Lake" (Intel 7)
All models support: SSE4.1, SSE4.2, AVX, AVX2, FMA3, Enhanced Intel SpeedStep Technology (EIST), Intel 64, XD bit (an NX bit implementation), Intel VT-x, Intel VT-d, AES-NI, Smart Cache, DL Boost, GNA 3.0, and Optane memory.
All models support up to DDR5-4800 or DDR4-3200 memory, and 16 lanes of PCI Express 5.0 + 4 lanes of PCIe 4.0.

Mobile processors

P6 based Celerons

Mobile Celeron (single-core)

"Mendocino" (250 nm) 
 All models support: MMX

"Coppermine-128" (180 nm)   
 All models support: MMX, SSE

"Coppermine T" (180 nm) 
 All models support: MMX, SSE

"Tualatin-256" (130 nm)   
 All models support: MMX, SSE

Netburst based Celerons

Mobile Celeron (single-core)

"Northwood-256" (130 nm) 
 All models support: MMX, SSE, SSE2

Pentium-M based Celerons

Celeron M (single-core)

"Banias-512" (130 nm) 
 All models support: MMX, SSE, SSE2

"Dothan-1024" (90 nm) 
 All models support: MMX, SSE, SSE2
 XD bit (an NX bit implementation): supported by 360J, 370, 380, 390, 383

"Dothan-512" (90 nm) 
 All models support: MMX, SSE, SSE2, XD bit (an NX bit implementation)

"Yonah-512" (65 nm) 
 All models support: MMX, SSE, SSE2, SSE3, XD bit (an NX bit implementation)
 Steppings: C0

"Yonah-1024" (65 nm) 
 All models support: MMX, SSE, SSE2, SSE3, XD bit (an NX bit implementation)
 Steppings: C0, D0

"Sossaman" (65 nm) 
 All models support: MMX, SSE, SSE2, SSE3, Enhanced Intel SpeedStep Technology (EIST), XD bit (an NX bit implementation), Intel VT-x
 Die size: 90.3 mm2
 Steppings: D0

Core based Celerons

Celeron M/Celeron (single-core)

"Merom", "Merom-L" (standard-voltage, 65 nm)  

 All models support: MMX, SSE, SSE2, SSE3, SSSE3, Intel 64, XD bit (an NX bit implementation)
 Steppings: B2, E1, G0, G2, A1

"Merom-2M" (standard-voltage, 65 nm) 
 All models support: MMX, SSE, SSE2, SSE3, SSSE3, Intel 64, XD bit (an NX bit implementation)
 Steppings: M0

"Merom-L" (ultra-low-voltage, 65 nm) 
 All models support: MMX, SSE, SSE2, SSE3, SSSE3, Intel 64, XD bit (an NX bit implementation)
 Steppings: A1, M1

Celeron (single-core)

"Penryn-3M" (45 nm)   
 All models support: MMX, SSE, SSE2, SSE3, SSSE3, Intel 64, XD bit (an NX bit implementation)
 Package size: 35 mm2 (standard voltage), 22 mm2 (low voltage)
 Steppings: R0
 Die size: 107 mm2

 Note that 900 has also been used for three earlier models of Intel Celeron microprocessors with different microarchitectures.
 Intel initially listed the Celeron 900 as Dual-Core and with Virtualization Technology in its Processorfinder and ARK databases, which caused confusion among customers.
 ULV 723 possibly supports EIST, but Intel's web site is inconsistent about this.

Celeron (dual-core)

"Merom-2M" (65 nm) 

 All models support: MMX, SSE, SSE2, SSE3, SSSE3, Intel 64, XD bit (an NX bit implementation)
 Steppings: M0

 Note that Intel has also released Core Solo microprocessors with the model numbers T1400, T1500, and T1600.
 T1700 possibly supports EIST, but Intel's web site is inconsistent about this.

"Penryn-3M" (45 nm)   
 Based on Core microarchitecture
 All models support: MMX, SSE, SSE2, SSE3, SSSE3, Intel 64, XD bit (an NX bit implementation)
 Steppings: R0

 Note that the Pentium T3x00 processors have a similar number but are based on the older Merom-2M chips.
 Note that the Pentium SU2xxx processors have a similar number but are single-core processors.

Westmere based Celerons

Celeron (dual-core)

"Arrandale" (MCP, 32 nm)   
 Based on Westmere microarchitecture
 All models support: MMX, SSE, SSE2, SSE3, SSSE3, Enhanced Intel SpeedStep Technology (EIST), Intel 64, XD bit (an NX bit implementation), Intel VT-x, Smart Cache
 P4505 and U3405 support memory ECC RAM and PCIe bifurcation.
 FSB has been replaced with DMI.
 Contains 45 nm "Ironlake" GPU.
 Die size: 81 mm2
 Graphics and Integrated Memory Controller die size: 114 mm2
 Steppings: C2, K0

Sandy Bridge based Celerons

"Sandy Bridge" (32 nm) 
 All models support: MMX, SSE, SSE2, SSE3, SSSE3, SSE4.1, SSE4.2, Enhanced Intel SpeedStep Technology (EIST), Intel 64, XD bit (an NX bit implementation), Intel VT-x, Smart Cache.
 (Embedded) Celeron B810E, Celeron B847E does not support XD bit(Execute Disable Bit), nor SSE4.1 and SSE4.2 instructions.
 (Embedded) Celeron B810E, Celeron B847E has support for ECC memory.
 HD Graphics (Sandy Bridge) contain 6 EUs as well as HD Graphics 2000, but does not support the following technologies: Intel Quick Sync Video, InTru 3D, Clear Video HD, Wireless Display, and it doesn't support 3D Video.
 Transistors: 624 or 504 million
 Die size: 149 or 131 mm2

"Ivy Bridge" (22 nm) 
 All models support: MMX, SSE, SSE2, SSE3, SSSE3, SSE4.1, SSE4.2, Enhanced Intel SpeedStep Technology (EIST), Intel 64, XD bit (an NX bit implementation), Intel VT-x, Smart Cache.
 HD Graphics (Ivy Bridge) contain 6 EUs as well as HD Graphics 2500, but does not support the following technologies: Intel Quick Sync Video, InTru 3D, Clear Video HD, Wireless Display, Intel Insider.
 Embedded models have support for ECC memory.

Haswell based Celerons

"Haswell-MB" (22 nm) 
 All models support: MMX, SSE, SSE2, SSE3, SSSE3, SSE4.1, SSE4.2, Enhanced Intel SpeedStep Technology (EIST), Intel 64, XD bit (an NX bit implementation), Intel VT-x, Smart Cache.
 2970M supports Intel Quick Sync Video.

"Haswell-ULT" (SiP, 22 nm) 

 All models support: MMX, SSE, SSE2, SSE3, SSSE3, SSE4.1, SSE4.2, Enhanced Intel SpeedStep Technology (EIST), Intel 64, XD bit (an NX bit implementation), Intel VT-x, Smart Cache.
 2957U and 2981U also support Intel Wireless Display and Intel Quick Sync Video.
 Transistors: 1.3 billion
 Die size: 181 mm2

"Haswell-ULX" (SiP, 22 nm) 

 All models support: MMX, SSE, SSE2, SSE3, SSSE3, SSE4.1, SSE4.2, Enhanced Intel SpeedStep Technology (EIST), Intel 64, XD bit (an NX bit implementation), Intel VT-x, Smart Cache.
 Transistors: 1.3 billion
 Die size: 181 mm2
 GPU supports Intel Quick Sync Video.

"Haswell-H" (22 nm) 

 All models support: MMX, SSE, SSE2, SSE3, SSSE3, SSE4.1, SSE4.2, Enhanced Intel SpeedStep Technology (EIST), Intel 64, XD bit (an NX bit implementation), Intel VT-x, Smart Cache.
 Transistors: 1.3 billion
 Die size: 181 mm2
 Embedded models support ECC memory
 GPU doesn't support Intel Quick Sync Video.

"Broadwell-U" (14 nm) 
 All models support: MMX, SSE, SSE2, SSE3, SSSE3, SSE4.1, SSE4.2, Enhanced Intel SpeedStep Technology (EIST), Intel 64, XD bit (an NX bit implementation), Intel VT-x, Intel VT-d, Smart Cache, Intel Wireless Display, and configurable TDP (cTDP) down

Silvermont based Celerons

"Bay Trail-M" (22 nm)
 All models support: MMX, SSE, SSE2, SSE3, SSSE3, SSE4.1, SSE4.2, Enhanced Intel SpeedStep Technology (EIST), Intel 64, XD bit (an NX bit implementation), Intel VT-x.
 GPU and memory controller are integrated onto the processor die
 GPU is based on Ivy Bridge Intel HD Graphics, with 4 execution units, and supports DirectX 11, OpenGL 4.0, OpenGL ES 3.0 and OpenCL 1.1. N2807, N2808, N2830, N2840, N2930 and N2940 support Intel Quick Sync Video.
 Package size:  25 mm × 27 mm

Airmont based Celerons

"Braswell" (14 nm)
 All models support: MMX, SSE, SSE2, SSE3, SSSE3, SSE4.1, SSE4.2, Enhanced Intel SpeedStep Technology (EIST), Intel 64, XD bit (an NX bit implementation), Intel VT-x, AES-NI.
 GPU and memory controller are integrated onto the processor die
 GPU is based on Broadwell Intel HD Graphics, with 12 execution units, and supports DirectX 11.2, OpenGL 4.3, OpenGL ES 3.0 and OpenCL 1.2 (on Windows).
 Package size: 25 mm × 27 mm

Skylake based Celerons

"Skylake-U" (14 nm) 
 All models support: MMX, SSE, SSE2, SSE3, SSSE3, SSE4.1, SSE4.2, Enhanced Intel SpeedStep Technology (EIST), Intel 64, XD bit (an NX bit implementation), Intel VT-x, Intel VT-d, AES-NI, Smart Cache, Intel Wireless Display, and configurable TDP (cTDP) down

Goldmont based Celerons

"Apollo Lake" (14 nm)
 All models support: MMX, SSE, SSE2, SSE3, SSSE3, SSE4.1, SSE4.2, Enhanced Intel SpeedStep Technology (EIST), Intel 64, XD bit (an NX bit implementation), Intel VT-x, Intel VT-d, AES-NI.
 GPU and memory controller are integrated onto the processor die
 GPU is based on Skylake Intel HD Graphics, with 12 execution units, and supports DirectX 12, OpenGL 4.5, OpenGL ES 3.0 and OpenCL 1.2 (on Windows).
 Package size: 24 mm × 31 mm

Goldmont Plus based Celerons

"Gemini Lake" (14 nm)
 All models support: MMX, SSE, SSE2, SSE3, SSSE3, SSE4.1, SSE4.2, Enhanced Intel SpeedStep Technology (EIST), Intel 64, XD bit (an NX bit implementation), Intel SGX, Intel VT-x, Intel VT-d, AES-NI.
 GPU and memory controller are integrated onto the processor die
 GPU is based on Kaby Lake Intel HD Graphics, with 12 execution units, and supports DirectX 12, OpenGL 4.5, OpenGL ES 3.0 and OpenCL 1.2 (on Windows).
 Package size: 25 mm × 24 mm

"Gemini Lake Refresh" (14 nm)
 All models support: MMX, SSE, SSE2, SSE3, SSSE3, SSE4.1, SSE4.2, Enhanced Intel SpeedStep Technology (EIST), Intel 64, XD bit (an NX bit implementation), Intel SGX, Intel VT-x, Intel VT-d, AES-NI.
 GPU and memory controller are integrated onto the processor die
 GPU is based on Kaby Lake Intel HD Graphics, with 12 execution units, and supports DirectX 12, OpenGL 4.5, OpenGL ES 3.0 and OpenCL 1.2 (on Windows).
 Package size: 25 mm × 24 mm

Kaby Lake based Celerons

"Kaby Lake-U" (14 nm) 
 All models support: MMX, SSE, SSE2, SSE3, SSSE3, SSE4.1, SSE4.2, SGX, MPX, Enhanced Intel SpeedStep Technology (EIST), Intel 64, XD bit (an NX bit implementation), Intel VT-x, Intel VT-d, AES-NI, Smart Cache, and configurable TDP (cTDP) down

"Kaby Lake-Y" (14 nm) 
 All models support: MMX, SSE, SSE2, SSE3, SSSE3, SSE4.1, SSE4.2, SGX, MPX, Enhanced Intel SpeedStep Technology (EIST), Intel 64, XD bit (an NX bit implementation), Intel VT-x, Intel VT-d, AES-NI, Smart Cache, and configurable TDP (cTDP) down

"Kaby Lake Refresh" (14 nm) 
 All models support: MMX, SSE, SSE2, SSE3, SSSE3, SSE4.1, SSE4.2, SGX, MPX, Enhanced Intel SpeedStep Technology (EIST), Intel 64, XD bit (an NX bit implementation), Intel VT-x, Intel VT-d, AES-NI, Smart Cache, and configurable TDP (cTDP) down.

Coffee Lake based Celerons

"Whiskey Lake-U" (14 nm)

Comet Lake based Celerons

"Comet Lake-U" (14 nm)

Tiger Lake based Celerons

"Tiger Lake-UP3" (10 nm SuperFin) 
 All models support: SSE4.1, SSE4.2, AVX2, FMA3, Speed Shift Technology (SST), Intel 64, Intel VT-x, Intel VT-d, AES-NI, Smart Cache, DL Boost, Optane memory, GNA 2.0, IPU6, TB4.

Tremont based Celerons

"Jasper Lake" (10 nm)
 All models support: MMX, SSE, SSE2, SSE3, SSSE3, SSE4.1, SSE4.2, Enhanced Intel SpeedStep Technology (EIST), Intel 64, XD bit (an NX bit implementation), Intel VT-x, Intel VT-d, AES-NI, Intel SHA Extensions, Intel SGX, SMAP/SMEP
 Package size: 35 mm x 24 mm
 DDR4/LPDDR4 dual-channel memory controller supporting up to 16 GB
 Display controller with 1 MIPI DSI 1.2 port and 3 DDI ports (eDP 1.4b, MIPI DSI 1.2, DP 1.4a, or HDMI 2.0b)
 Integrated Intel HD Graphics (Gen11) GPU
 PCI Express 3.0 controller supporting 8 lanes (multiplexed); 4 lanes available externally
 Two USB 3.2 2x1 ports (a.k.a. USB 3.1)
 Four USB 3.2 1x1 ports (a.k.a. USB 3.0)
 Eight USB 2.0 ports
 Two SATA-600 ports
 Integrated HD audio controller
 Integrated image signal processor supporting four cameras (three concurrent)
 Integrated memory card reader supporting SDIO 3.0 and eMMC 5.1
 Serial I/O supporting SPI, HSUART (serial port) and I2C
 Integrated CNVi with Wi-Fi 6 (IEEE 802.11ax 1x1 and 2x2) and Bluetooth 5.x (using UART/I2S/USB2)

Alder Lake based Celerons

"Alder Lake-U" (Intel 7) 
 All models support: SSE4.1, SSE4.2, AVX, AVX2, FMA3, Speed Shift Technology (SST), Intel 64, Intel VT-x, Intel VT-d, AES-NI, IPU6, TB4, Smart Cache, Thread Director, DL Boost, and GNA 3.0.
 Support 20 lanes (UP3) or 14 lanes (UP4) of PCI Express 4.0/3.0.
 All models support up to LPDDR5-5200 or LPDDR4X-4266 memory
 Standard power models also support up to DDR5-4800 or DDR4-3200 memory.

Embedded processors

Nehalem based Celerons

Celeron (single-core)

"Jasper Forest" (45 nm) 
 All models support: MMX, SSE, SSE2, SSE3, SSSE3, Enhanced Intel SpeedStep Technology (EIST), Intel 64, XD bit (an NX bit implementation), Intel VT-x, Intel VT-d, HyperThreading, Smart Cache, ECC memory.
 Single-Core version of Xeon C3500-Series

Sandy Bridge based Celerons

Celeron (single-core)

"Gladden" (32 nm)

 All models support: MMX, SSE, SSE2, SSE3, SSSE3, SSE4.1, SSE4.2, AVX, Enhanced Intel SpeedStep Technology (EIST), Intel 64, XD bit (an NX bit implementation), Intel VT-x, EPT, Hyper-threading, Smart Cache, ECC memory.
 Transistors:
 Die size:

Tremont based Celerons

"Elkhart Lake" (10 nm SuperFin)
 All models support: MMX, SSE, SSE2, SSE3, SSSE3, SSE4.1, SSE4.2, Intel 64, XD bit (an NX bit implementation), Intel VT-x, Intel VT-d, AES-NI.
 GPU is based on Gen11 Intel HD Graphics, with up to 32 execution units, and supports up to 3 displays (4K @ 60 Hz) through HDMI, DP, eDP, or DSI.
 SoC peripherals include 4 × USB 2.0/3.0/3.1, 2 × SATA,  3 × 2.5GbE LAN, UART, and up to 8 lanes of PCI Express 3.0 in x4, x2, and x1 configurations.
 Package size: 35 mm × 24 mm

Tiger Lake based Celerons

"Tiger Lake-H" (10 nm SuperFin) 
 All models support: SSE4.1, SSE4.2, AVX2, AVX-512, FMA3, Speed Shift Technology (SST), Intel 64, Intel VT-x, Intel VT-d, AES-NI, Smart Cache, DL Boost, Optane memory, GNA 2.0, IPU6, TB4.

Alder Lake based Celerons

"Alder Lake-U" (Intel 7) 
 All models support: SSE4.1, SSE4.2, AVX, AVX2, FMA3, Speed Shift Technology (SST), Intel 64, Intel VT-x, Intel VT-d, AES-NI, IPU6, TB4, Smart Cache, Thread Director, DL Boost, and GNA 3.0.
 Support 20 lanes (UP3) of PCI Express 4.0/3.0.
 All models support up to LPDDR5-5200 or LPDDR4X-4266 memory
 Standard power models also support up to DDR5-4800 or DDR4-3200 memory.

See also 
 Intel Celeron
 List of Intel Pentium microprocessors
 List of Intel Core i3 microprocessors
 List of Intel Core i5 microprocessors
 List of Intel Core i7 microprocessors
 List of Intel Core i9 microprocessors

Notes

References 

 New Celeron 220, Xtreview 15 October 2007

External links
 Search MDDS Database
 Intel ARK Database
 'Yonah' Celeron M 420, 430 ship in Japan 
 Intel CPU Transition Roadmap 2008-2013
 Intel Desktop CPU Roadmap 2004-2011
 Intel Celeron desktop processor product order code table
 Intel Celeron mobile processor product order code table

Celeron
Intel Celeron